Martinique Aimé Césaire International Airport  is the international airport of Martinique in the French West Indies. Located in Le Lamentin, a suburb of the capital Fort-de-France, it was opened in 1950 and renamed in 2007, after author and politician Aimé Césaire.

Facilities 
When Air Martinique existed, its headquarters was located on the airport property. The runway is of a length that can accommodate large jets, including 747s from France. On at least two occasions, the Concorde flew from Paris and landed at the airport in Martinique.

Passenger facilities include police, customs, baggage claim, pharmacy, vaccination bureau, handicap facilities, tobacconist, bank, money changing, souvenir shops, tax-free shopping, gift shop, florist, hairdresser, car rentals, taxi, parking, restaurants, cafés and bars, and two hotels (Hôtel La Galléria and Hôtel Valmenière).

Cargo facilities include a 747 freighter dock, bonded warehouse, transit zone, mechanical handling, heated storage, refrigerated storage, mortuary, fresh meat inspection, health officials, very large/heavy cargo, and an express/courier centre.

Airlines and destinations

Passenger

Cargo

Statistics

References

External links 
  
 Aéroport de Fort-de-France Le Lamentin, official page 
 Aéroport de Fort-de-France – Le Lamentin at L'Union des Aéroports Français 
 Le Lamentin Airport at azworldairports.com
 All the news from the airport Martinique TFFF -(French)

Airports in Martinique
Airport
1950 establishments in Martinique
Airports established in 1950